Timothy Maddren (born 3 March 1984) is a New Zealand-born Australian musician best known as a member of the Australian children's musical group Hi-5. He was a replacement for Nathan Foley in 2008. He left Hi-5 in February 2013 after four years. His replacement was Ainsley Melham. Maddren worked at Hi-5 in three seasons (135 episodes).

Early life
Maddren was born in Blenheim, New Zealand. He was raised in a musical family and was encouraged from an early age to develop his performing and entertaining skills. He plays guitar, piano, trumpet and drums. Maddren is left-handed.

In 2003 Maddren moved to Perth, Australia to study at the WAAPA (Western Australian Academy of Performing Arts) from which he graduated in 2005.

Career 
He performed in many theatrical productions, including Fiddler on the Roof (2007), A Funny Thing Happened On The Way To The Forum, Chess, Les Miserables, Crazy For You, International Miners Emporium, Street Scene, Guys & Dolls, Little Shop of Horrors and My Fair Lady. In 2008 he was part of the original Australian cast in the musical comedy Altar Boyz playing the role of Luke.

Television credits include Blue Water High playing the guest role of Connor (ABC TV).

Maddren taught singing and acting at the Ministry of Dance, North Melbourne.

He became part of the Hi-5 cast on 5 January 2009. Maddren has expressed that the best part of Hi-5 is "seeing all the happy faces on the kids when we're up there performing in front of them."

Maddren had a parallel career to Hi-5, acting in The Addams Family, playing Lucas Beineke.

Maddren is performing in the role of Brad Majors in the Australian tour of The Rocky Horror Show.

Filmography

References

External links
 

1984 births
Living people
New Zealand children's musicians
Australian children's musicians
New Zealand expatriates in Australia
Australian rock drummers
Australian rock guitarists
Australian rock singers
Australian pianists
Australian trumpeters
Australian television presenters
Australian male stage actors
New Zealand drummers
New Zealand pianists
21st-century trumpeters
Male pianists
21st-century New Zealand male singers
21st-century pianists
21st-century guitarists
21st-century drummers
21st-century Australian male singers
New Zealand male guitarists
Australian male guitarists